Darsakudu is a 2017 Indian Telugu-language film written and directed by Jakka Hari Prasad. The film features Ashok Bandreddi, Noel Sean, Eesha Rebba and Pujita Ponnada in the lead roles. It is produced by BNCSP Vijaya Kumar, Thomas Reddy Aduri and Ravi Chandra Satti. The music was composed by Sai Karthik while cinematography was handled by Praveen Anumolu.

Plot

The film starts with Mahesh (Ashok Bandreddi) remembering his past in his favourite movie theatre which runs the movie called "Darsakudu" (director).

Coming to his story Mahesh who is a director aspirant and a short film maker who believes that direction is nothing but 80% management and 20% creativity. From his childhood he is very passionate about film direction and he promises to his father that he will become a big film director. Then somehow he managed to get a chance to direct his first film with Rakesh (Noel San) an upcoming hero with a star producer (Kedar Shanker) making a low budget film. But producer gives him a chance on one condition that if he cannot handle the project properly he will give the chance to his co-director. Then he has a perfect script with all elements in his story but he is not confident on love track. 

Then, returning to city from his hometown he accidentally meets his childhood friend Namratha (Eesha Rebba), a fashion designer in a train. Then he woos her successfully with comical circumstances and finally she proposes to him. Then she observes him that he woos her because to fulfill his love track in his script then she broke up with him on the spot and tells him that he cannot understand her love because he is just a director not a lover.

After that movie goes into sets in the press meet Mahesh introduces him as Anand it frustrates Namrata more and came to the sets to make quarrel with Mahesh. Meanwhile, Mahesh is not satisfied with the heroine's performance who was recommended by the co-director. Then Namrata came to quarrel with him along with her friend Shailu (Pujitha Ponnada) in the sets. He offers heroine's role to Shailu, she happily accepts. Then Namrata eventually becomes fashion designer in the movie she does not have any interest to work with him, but she works to get a good opportunity in films. Then she observes sets and scenes she understands that Mahesh completely copied their encounters it frustrates her more. Then on Namrata's birthday she consumes alcohol first time and confesses her feelings on him and says that she only loves him he is not loving her because he is just a director not a lover because of that he don't bother others feelings and copy it for his films.

Then the next day morning co-director comes to visit his house and misunderstands them. Complains to producer, then producer blames Mahesh that because of him the film was going to be delayed he invested his properties on that film so he cannot take risks anymore and warns him to remove from the film showing any negligence on his part. Then to focus on the film Mahesh removes Namrata from the film. Then after knowing this, Namrata gets angry and quarrels again with Mahesh. Then in the shooting spot she met with an accident and is severely injured. Mahesh sends her to hospital and continues shooting. Then after completion of shooting producer asks to add an item song in the film, but Mahesh refuses to add then angered producer removes him from the film and gives offer to the co-director, but this time co-director supports Mahesh and denies his offer.

After Namrata's discharge she meets Mahesh's friend and writer of his film. He says that he met Mahesh he said to him that he is a director he want to watch all the things on the director's point of view only. He loves Namrata a lot that's why he showed their romantic encounters as the film. Then Namrata realises his love and comes to visit him but he is nowhere. Meanwhile, press and media gives Darsakudu movie a good review and says in the movie they didn't mention the director's name. Then producer reveals their discussion and why he removed his name. Then Namrata meets the producer and request to change the climax in his film to locate him soon. Through media he knows news and decided to watch his film in his favourite theatre. Then the theatre plays Namrata's video requesting him to come back as a director, she loves him always either he loves her or not. Then Namrata appears in front of him and proposes to him again, then suddenly she observes a dialogue recorder in his pocket and angrily hugs him.

Cast
Ashok Bandreddi as Mahesh
Noel Sean as Rakesh
Eesha Rebba as Namratha
Pujita Ponnada as Shailu

Soundtrack

The soundtrack of the film was composed by Sai Karthik and released by Aditya Music.

Reception 
The Times of India critic Neeshita Nyayapati rated the film 2.5 stars out of 5, and wrote: "‘Darsakudu’ seems like the soul of Namrata — a film that wants nothing to do with Tollywood, and yet does almost everything it can to fit in, simply because of its love for the industry." Y. Sunitha Chowdhary of The Hindu stated, "‘Darsakudu’ fails to utilise an interesting premise to its advantage." A reviewer from 123Telugu.com rated 2.75/5 and opined, "Darsakudu is a predictable love story which has nothing novel to offer."

References

External links
 

2017 films
2010s Telugu-language films
Films about filmmaking
Indian drama films
2017 directorial debut films
Films scored by Sai Karthik
2017 drama films